Benjamin Williams (July 8, 1876 – February 11, 1957) was an American politician who served as Speaker of the Vermont House of Representatives and the 58th lieutenant governor of Vermont.

Life and career
Williams was born in Fair Haven, Vermont on July 8, 1876.  He graduated from Norwich University and was an attorney, executive of the Vermont Marble Company, and President of the Proctor Trust Company.

A Republican, Williams served as Proctor's Town Clerk from 1906 to 1918.  From 1906 to 1908 he was Secretary of Civil and Military Affairs (chief assistant) to Governor Fletcher D. Proctor.

Williams served in the Vermont House of Representatives from 1917 to 1921.  In 1920 he was elected to the Vermont State Senate, and served one term.

In 1928 he returned to the Vermont House, and was chosen to serve as Speaker.

In 1930 Williams was elected Lieutenant Governor, serving from 1931 to 1933.

Williams was an unsuccessful candidate for Governor in 1934, losing the Republican nomination to Charles M. Smith.

Williams died in Proctor on February 5, 1957.  He was buried in Fair Haven's Cedar Grove Cemetery.

References

External links

1876 births
1957 deaths
Burials in Vermont
Lieutenant Governors of Vermont
Norwich University alumni
People from Fair Haven, Vermont
People from Proctor, Vermont
Speakers of the Vermont House of Representatives
Republican Party members of the Vermont House of Representatives
Vermont lawyers
Republican Party Vermont state senators